The  (pronounced ) is a work of fictional sociolinguistics by J. R. R. Tolkien. It was published in The Lost Road and Other Writings (1987), volume five of The History of Middle-earth series. The word  is a Noldorin word meaning “account of tongues”. In Tolkien's later development of Sindarin he changed the rules governing initial l- and r- whereby they ceased being devoiced, resulting in the word becoming .

Theory 

The  as published presents the theory that all the languages of Middle-earth descend from the language of the angelic beings or Valar, Valarin, and were divided in three branches:

 Oromëan, named after Oromë, who taught the first Elves to speak. All languages of Elves and most languages of Men are Oromëan.
 Aulëan, named after Aulë, maker of the Dwarves, is the origin of the Khuzdul language. It has had some influences on the tongues of Men.
 Melkian, named after the rebellious Melkor or Morgoth, is the origin in the First Age of the many tongues used by the Orcs and other evil beings. (This tongue is unrelated to the Black Speech of Sauron.)

Tolkien later revised this internal history. The Elves were said by Tolkien to have been capable of inventing (constructing) their own language (see Primitive Quendian). Tolkien never wrote an 'updated' version of the  that would be coherent with this later internal history of the Elvish languages. The essay as it stands in The Lost Road can be thus seen as an interpolated manuscript, badly translated by Men in the Fourth Age or even later: "For many thousands of years have passed since the fall of Gondolin." (The Lhammas, p. 180).

Concept and creation
The  was written in 1937. Both are published, as edited by Christopher Tolkien, in The Lost Road.

The  and related writings like "The Etymologies" illustrate Tolkien's conception of the languages of Middle-earth as a language family analogous to Indo-European, with diverging branches and sub-branches — though for the immortal Elves the proto-language is remembered rather than reconstructed. This "concept of increasing separation" was also employed for the Sundering of the Elves in Tolkien's legendarium.

The subject-matter is "direct thought-transmission" (telepathy), or  "thought-opening" in Quenya. Pengolodh included it as last chapter to the Lhammas because of the implications of spoken language on thought-transmission, and since the Incarnates (Elves, and Men) use a spoken language, telepathy can become more difficult with time (cf. hröa).

References

Tolkien linguistic studies
The History of Middle-earth
1987 fiction books